The 1967 Masters Tournament was the 31st Masters Tournament, held April 6–9 at Augusta National Golf Club. Gay Brewer won his only major title by one stroke over runner-up Bobby Nichols.

Rebounding from a three-putt on the 72nd hole and a playoff loss the previous year, Brewer birdied the 13th, 14th, and 15th holes on Sunday. Arnold Palmer finished in fourth and Gary Player finished tied for 6th, while Sam Snead and Ben Hogan, both age 54, finished tied for 10th. In the third round, Hogan shot a 66 which was the lowest single round score in the tournament, while he struggled with an aching shoulder and legs. Hogan's round included a course record-tying 30 on the back nine, with birdies at 10, 11, 12, 13, 15, and 18, with pars at the other three holes. It was later equaled by Player in 1978 and Jack Nicklaus in 1986; both shot 30 on the back nine on Sunday to win by a stroke. The record stood until Mark Calcavecchia shot 29 on the back nine in 1992 (David Toms also shot a 29 on the back nine in 1998). This was Hogan's final appearance in the Masters; his last major was two months later at the U.S. Open. For Snead, a three-time champion, it marked his final top ten finish at Augusta; he participated into the 1980s.

It was also the last Masters for three-time champion Jimmy Demaret as a participant, who missed the cut by four strokes. He won the Masters in 1940, 1947, and 1950, but had not played in the other three majors since 1958.

Two-time defending champion Nicklaus shot a nine-bogey 79 in the second round and missed the cut by one stroke, the first defending champion not to play on the weekend. (The 36-hole cut at Augusta was introduced a decade earlier, in 1957.) It was his only missed cut at the Masters from 1960 through 1993 (withdrew before 2nd round in 1983); he missed the cut by a stroke in his first appearance in 1959 at age 19. Nicklaus regrouped and won the next major, the U.S. Open at Baltusrol. With the missed cut, Nicklaus failed to qualify for the Ryder Cup team, the first for which he was eligible. He had been in a minor slump and only became eligible in mid-1966, more than halfway through the two-year qualifying cycle, His win in the previous Masters did not count for the Ryder Cup as it was prior to his full PGA of America membership and it was the era prior to captains' picks.

Arnold Palmer won the eighth Par 3 contest with a score of 23. Like Hogan and Snead, this was his last top 10 in the Masters.

Course

^ Holes 1, 2, 4, and 11 were later renamed.

Field
1. Masters champions
Jack Burke Jr., Jimmy Demaret, Doug Ford (8), Ralph Guldahl, Claude Harmon, Ben Hogan (8,9), Herman Keiser, Cary Middlecoff, Jack Nicklaus (2,3,4,8,9), Arnold Palmer (2,3,8,9,10,11), Henry Picard, Gary Player (2,3,4,9,10), Gene Sarazen, Sam Snead (10), Art Wall Jr.
Byron Nelson and Craig Wood did not play.

The following categories only apply to Americans

2. U.S. Open champions (last 10 years)
Tommy Bolt (8), Julius Boros (10,11), Billy Casper (8,9,10,11), Gene Littler (10,11), Dick Mayer, Ken Venturi (8,11)

3. The Open champions (last 10 years)

4. PGA champions (last 10 years)
Jerry Barber, Dow Finsterwald, Al Geiberger (10), Jay Hebert (8), Lionel Hebert, Dave Marr (9,10), Bobby Nichols (8,9), Bob Rosburg (8)

5. The first eight finishers in the 1966 U.S. Amateur
Don Allen (a), Deane Beman (7,a), Ron Cerrudo (7,a), Jimmy Grant (a), Downing Gray (7,a), Jack Lewis Jr. (a), Dick Siderowf (a)

Grant and Mike Morley tied for 8th place but Grace won the place by the drawing of lots. Morley was later invited under a different category.

6. Previous two U.S. Amateur and Amateur champion
Bob Murphy (7,9,a)

7. Members of the 1966 U.S. Eisenhower Trophy team

8. Top 24 players and ties from the 1966 Masters Tournament
Tommy Aaron, Frank Beard, Gay Brewer, Terry Dill, Raymond Floyd, Paul Harney, Tommy Jacobs (11), Don January (11), Phil Rodgers (9), Doug Sanders (9,10)

9. Top 16 players and ties from the 1966 U.S. Open
Wes Ellis, Rod Funseth, Rives McBee, Johnny Miller (a), Mason Rudolph

10. Top eight players and ties from 1966 PGA Championship
Jacky Cupit, Dudley Wysong

11. Members of the U.S. 1965 Ryder Cup team
Johnny Pott

12. Two players selected for meritorious records on the fall part of the 1966 PGA Tour
Bob Goalby, Bert Yancey

13. One player, either amateur or professional, not already qualified, selected by a ballot of ex-Masters champions.
Gardner Dickinson

14. One professional, not already qualified, selected by a ballot of ex-U.S. Open champions.
Don Massengale

15. One amateur, not already qualified, selected by a ballot of ex-U.S. Amateur champions.
Mike Morley (a)

16. Two players, not already qualified, from a points list based on finishes in the winter part of the PGA Tour
George Archer, Ken Still

17. Foreign invitations
Peter Alliss, Peter Butler (8), Joe Carr (a), Bob Charles (3), Chen Ching-Po (8), Bobby Cole (6,a), Gary Cowan (5,6,a), Bruce Crampton (8), Roberto De Vicenzo (8), Bruce Devlin, Harold Henning (8), Tony Jacklin, George Knudson (8), Kel Nagle (3), Chi-Chi Rodríguez, Luis Silverio (a), Ramón Sota, Bob Stanton, Hideyo Sugimoto, Dave Thomas, Bobby Verwey

Round summaries

First round
Thursday, April 6, 1967

Source:

Second round
Friday, April 7, 1967

Source:

Third round
Saturday, April 8, 1967

Source:

Final round
Sunday, April 9, 1967

Final leaderboard

Sources:

Scorecard

Cumulative tournament scores, relative to par

References

External links
Masters.com – Past winners
Augusta.com – 1967 Masters leaderboard and scorecards

1967
1967 in golf
1967 in American sports
1967 in sports in Georgia (U.S. state)
April 1967 sports events in the United States